A cowl is an item of clothing consisting of a long, hooded garment with wide sleeves, often worn by monks.

Originally it may have referred simply to the hooded portion of a cloak. In contemporary usage, however, it is distinguished from a cloak or cape (cappa) by the fact that it refers to an entire closed garment. Today it is worn primarily by most Catholic and Anglican monks when participating in liturgical services.

Religious usage
Developed during the Early Middle Ages, it became the formal garment for those in monastic life. Both St. Jerome and John Cassian refer to it as part of a monk's dress. In modern times, it is worn over the habit during liturgical services.

Among the Benedictines, in choir, at chapter, and at certain other ceremonial times, a long full gown with large flowing sleeves, called a "cowl", is worn over the ordinary habit. Black has been the prevailing color, hence the term "black monk" has come to signify a Benedictine. Previous generations had lengthened the garment until it reached to the heels, and Saint Benedict issued a rule restricting its length to two cubits.

Similarly, the Cistercians are known as the "White Monks", in reference to the color of the "cuculla" or white choir robe worn over their habits, as opposed to the black cuculla worn by Benedictine monks. "The Carthusian wears the ordinary monastic habit in white serge, but the scapular which is joined by bands at the side and has the hood attached to it, is known as the "cowl". The long flowing garment with wide sleeves, which usually bears this name, is used only by the deacon at high Mass."

The cowl is traditionally bestowed upon the monk at the time of making solemn, or lifetime, profession. Prior to their solemn vows, the monks still in training wear a hooded cloak. The cowl is generally worn in conformity with the color of the monk's tunic; other groups which follow the Rule of St. Benedict, e.g., the Camaldolese wearing white. (The Camaldolese of Monte Corona, however, always wear a cloak instead of a cowl.)

While not cowls in the monastic sense, the mendicant Orders have retained the use of a cappa (cape) as part of their habit. In their case, however, it is a regular part of their religious habit and worn by all members of the Order, both as street dress and in church.

The Carmelites wear a white cape, although their tunic and scapular are brown, from which they were known in medieval England as the "Whitefriars".

Dominicans wear a black cape over a white habit—hence, their ancient nickname of "Blackfriars".

Both the cowl and the cape, though without a hood, are also worn by the nuns associated to each Order, in the same manner.

Among the Eastern Christians (Eastern Orthodox and Byzantine Catholic) the monastic hood developed into the koukoulion worn by monks of the Great Schema, the highest degree of monasticism in the Eastern Church.

Currently the koukoulion is of two types: one is similar to the hood still worn by some Western monastic orders, the other takes the form of a stiff rounded hat (like a bowler hat without a rim) to which is attached an epanokalimavkion (veil with lappets). The koukoulion is usually embroidered with crosses and the Instruments of the Passion. The koukoulion is also worn by the Patriarchs of some of the autocephalous Orthodox churches.

See also

Burqa
Chador
Hoodie
Koukoulion

References

Medieval European costume
Christian clothing
History of clothing
Christian monasticism
Religious (Catholicism)